Valmet Oyj, a Finnish company, is a developer and supplier of technologies, automation systems and services for the pulp, paper and energy industries.

Valmet has over 200 years of history as an industrial operator. Formerly owned by the State of Finland, Valmet was reborn in December 2013 with the demerger of the pulp, paper and power businesses from Metso Corporation.

Valmet's services include maintenance outsourcing, mill and power plant improvements, and spare parts. The company provides technology for pulp, tissue, board and paper mills and bioenergy plants. Valmet has operations in more than 40 countries and it employs about 17,000 people. Its headquarters are located in Espoo, and it is listed on the Nasdaq Helsinki.  In 2021, Valmet's net sales totaled €3.9 billion.

History

Historical products 
During its history, Valmet has made ships, trains, aeroplanes, tractors, clocks and weapons, as described in the list of Valmet products.

Roots in the 18th century

The company originated in the 1750s when a small shipyard was established in the Sveaborg fortress (now called Suomenlinna) on the islands outside Helsinki, at the time a part of the Swedish province Nyland. In the early 20th century, it ended up under the ownership of the Finnish state and became part of Valmet. Tamfelt was established in 1797 and became one of the leading suppliers of technical textiles. These operations are now part of Valmet's Service business line.

Several of the companies forming part of the new Valmet Corporation that was born in the 2010s date back to the 19th century. The Karlstad Mekaniska Werkstad (KMW) in Sweden began in 1865. Beloit Corporation began in 1858 as a foundry in the city of Beloit, Wisconsin, US. Sunds Bruk, the predecessor of Sunds Defibrator Industries Ab, was established in Sweden in 1868.

1946–1998 Creation of Valmet

In 1946, several metal workshops owned by the Finnish state were merged to form the Valtion Metallitehtaat, abbreviated as ValMet. The new company came to include various metalworks that manufactured war reparations products for the Soviet Union in different parts of Finland. In the year of its establishment, the company had some 6,200 employees.

At the beginning of 1951, the Valtion Metallitehtaat group was renamed Valmet Oy. The various factories, which had previously manufactured warships, aircraft and artillery pieces, spent years finding their new purposes. The conversion of an artillery works into a paper machine manufacturer was a success, but import restrictions created serious obstacles in its route to Western markets. The company's shipyard operations were often –and unfavorably – compared to those of Wärtsilä. The airplane industry was maintained to strengthen national security, but it was not profitable. The branch did, however, make a solid contribution to Valmet's product development and designed, among other things, the straddle carrier used in harbors and manufactured as part of Finland's war reparations. For decades, the entire conglomerate searched for new fields, such as the manufacture of cars or instrumentation. Modern quality control of production operations entered the Finnish manufacturing industry via Valmet's operations, for example in its car factories. National politics strongly influenced the management and decision-making in the company.

Valmet began manufacturing paper machines at the former Rautpohja artillery works in Jyväskylä, Finland in the early 1950s and delivered its first paper machine in 1953. Valmet became a paper machine supplier of international importance in the mid-1960s, when it delivered several machines to the world's leading paper industry countries.

In 1961, Valmet had 8,841 employees.

Valmet had shipyards in Turku and Helsinki (first in the Katajanokka district, later in Vuosaari). In 1986, Valmet sold its shipbuilding operations to Wärtsilä Oy, which merged them with its own shipyards to form Wärtsilä Marine. The company was declared bankrupt in 1989. The operations continued under the names of Masa Yards Oy, Kvaerner Masa-Yards Oy, Aker Yards Oy, Aker Finnyards Oy, STX Finland Oy and currently as Meyer Turku Oy.

In connection with the shipyard transaction, Valmet bought from Wärtsilä a paper-finishing machinery unit located in Järvenpää, Finland. Together with Valmet's own paper machine manufacturing units, the Järvenpää unit formed Valmet Paperikoneet Oy, which then purchased Tampella's board machine manufacturing operations in 1992.

In 1986, Valmet's gun manufacturing unit in Jyväskylä was transferred under Sako-Valmet Oy, which was later renamed Sako Oy. The company is currently owned by the Italian gun manufacturer Beretta.

Valmet sold its tractor, forest machine and transportation vehicle manufacturing operations to Sisu Auto in 1994. In 1997, Sisu Auto was sold to Partek, and the tractors became known as Valtra Valmet, and later Valtra. In 2002, Kone Corporation bought Partek, and in 2004 it sold Sisu to Suomen Autoteollisuus Oy, formed by a group of Finnish private investors and the company management.

In 1988, Valmet had 17,405 employees.

1999–2012 Valmet and Rauma merge as Metso
In July 1999, Valmet Corporation and Rauma Corporation merged to form a new company. Initially called Valmet-Rauma Corporation, the name was changed to Metso Corporation in August 1999. At the time of the merger, Valmet was a paper and board machine supplier, while Rauma focused on fiber technology, rock crushing and flow control products. The merger produced an equipment supplier serving the process industry. Shares in Metso were listed on the Helsinki Stock Exchange, which replaced the listings of its predecessor companies.

In 2000, Metso acquired Beloit Corporation's tissue and paper-making technology as well as its service operations in the United States and France. In December 2006, Metso completed the acquisition of the pulping and power businesses from Norwegian company Aker Kvaerner ASA. The acquisition aimed to further improve the company's ability to serve the pulp and paper industries as a turnkey delivery partner, and to respond to the business opportunities created by power generation and biomass technologies. At the end of 2009, Metso acquired Tamfelt Corporation, one of the world's leading suppliers of technical textiles.

2013– Valmet reborn
On October 1, 2013, following a meeting, Metso was split into two companies: Valmet and Metso. After the demerger on December 31, 2013, the pulp, paper and power businesses of Metso formed the new Valmet Corporation, while the mining and construction and automation businesses remained with Metso.

Jukka Viinanen became chairman of Valmet's board of directors. Viinanen had served as a member of Metso's board from 2008 to 2013, and as the chairman since 2009.

In March 2015, Bo Risberg from Sweden replaced Jukka Viinanen as the chairman of Valmet's board of directors. Previously, Risberg had held a high position at ABB and the position of managing director at the construction supply company Hilti. He also holds positions of trust at Piab Holding, Grundfos Holding and Trelleborg, among others. The Members of the board are vice chairman Mikael von Frenckell, Lone Fønss Schrøder, Friederike Helfer, Pekka Lundmark, Erkki Pehu-Lehtonen and Rogerio Ziviani. Pekka Lundmark later resigned from the board after being nominated CEO of Fortum Corporation.
In April 2015, Valmet introduced an automation systems business. Valmet completed a EUR 340 million transaction with Metso to purchase its process automation system and service unit (PAS). y. At the time of the transaction, the PAS unit employed 1,600 people, and its net sales totaled EUR 300 million in 2013. In July 2015, Valmet announced the acquisition of Massimiliano Corsini's tissue paper rewinding business. The net sales of the 33-employee unit in Pescia, Italy, has remained steady at EUR 10 million in recent years. 

In the beginning of 2019, Valmet acquired North American-based GL&V for EUR 113 million. GL&V supplied technologies, upgrades and optimization services, rebuilds, and spare parts for the pulp and paper industry, especially in the areas of chemical pulping, stock preparation, papermaking, and finishing. The acquired operations employed about 630 people and the net sales were approximately EUR 160 million. In May 2019, Valmet acquired American J&L Fiber Services Inc., which employed about 100 people in Wisconsin, USA, with net sales of approximately EUR 30 million. J&L Fiber was a manufacturer and provider of refiner segments to the pulp, paper and fiberboard industry. The enterprise value of the acquisition was approximately EUR 51 million. Both of the acquired companies became a part of Valmet's Services business. In September 2019, Valmet announced building a new pilot facility at its Fiber Technology Center in Sundsvall, Sweden to strengthen the company's research and development capabilities related to bioenergy, biofuels, and biochemicals. The new pilot facility comprises new pilot equipment called “BioTrac”, which uses Valmet DNA control system.

Valmet 2020–

Main article: Neles

At the end of June 2020, Neles was separated from Metso. The State of Finland sold its share of 15 percent to Valmet. In mid-July, the Swedish company Alfa Laval made an offer to buy Neles. Valmet’s CEO Laine rebuked the board of Neles for ill-advised actions and accepting a price that was too low. Laine had previously managed the business operations of Neles and thought that Valmet could in time have bought more of its stock. Alfa Laval’s CEO said that they had bought Neles at a “pandemic discount,” and the front page of the Swedish financial newspaper Dagens Industri celebrated the fact that Sweden would soon own Finland’s industry. Valmet started buying Neles stock. By the fall, Valmet owned nearly 30 percent of the stock. Alfa Laval only received the support of a third of Neles owners for its takeover bid, and withdrew from the competition in November.

In January 2021, Valmet reported that it would supply the mills of the Swedish company Renewcell with equipment to produce dissolving pulp from recycled clothes and textiles. In May, Valmet announced that it would deliver drying technology to Spinnova, which produces textile fiber from cellulose. Valmet equipment for the textile industry is in high demand in Europe, because the collection of discarded textiles for recycling must be organized in the EU countries by 2025. Valmet had been developing recycling technology with Renewcell for years, and the companies constructed a pilot plant and a factory in Sundsvall together. In July 2021, Valmet and Neles agreed to merge. Neles owners obtained 18.8 percent of the merging company. The companies’ synergies were considered to be substantial during the transaction. Neles was thought to help increase sales in automation systems, while its products were also to be sold to the paper industry.

Neles merged into Valmet in April 2022, becoming Valmet’s fifth business line, Flow Control. The companies had several managers and employees who knew each other from Metso days. After the merger, the company had 17,000 employees, 3,000 of whom came from Neles.

Organization and products

Valmet's operations are divided into five geographical areas: North America, South America, EMEA, China, and Asia-Pacific. Valmet operates in some 40 countries and employs 17,000 people. Valmet's primary production sites are the Rautpohja factory in Jyväskylä, Finland, and the units in Sweden's Karlstad and Sundsvall and China's Xi'an and Shanghai. Rautpohja is the center of paper and board machine engineering operations, the manufacture of components such as headboxes and the assembly of machine deliveries to Europe.

Recognitions
In 2019, Valmet was included in the Dow Jones Sustainability Indices (DJSI) for the sixth consecutive year. The company was listed both in the Dow Jones Sustainability World and Europe indices. 
In January 2020, Valmet was listed in the CDP's annual A-list among the best companies leading on environmental transparency and performance.

See also 
Valmet Automotive

References

 
Companies listed on Nasdaq Helsinki
Conglomerate companies of Finland
Aircraft manufacturers of Finland
Motor vehicle manufacturers of Finland
Shipbuilding companies of Finland
Defence companies of Finland
1951 establishments in Finland
1999 disestablishments in Finland
Manufacturing companies established in 1951
Companies disestablished in 1999
Firearm manufacturers of Finland
Locomotive manufacturers of Finland
Finnish companies established in 1951